Leo Walter Stasica (June 15, 1916 – September 1982) was an American football running back and quarterback in the National Football League for the Brooklyn Dodgers, the Washington Redskins, and the Boston Yanks.  He attended the University of Illinois and the University of Colorado.  Stasica was drafted in the third round of the 1941 NFL Draft.

References

1916 births
1982 deaths
Sportspeople from Rockford, Illinois
American football quarterbacks
American football running backs
Illinois Fighting Illini football players
Colorado Buffaloes football players
Brooklyn Dodgers (NFL) players
Washington Redskins players
Boston Yanks players